Paddy Toland is the coach of the current Middle and Light Middleweight kickboxing champion, Tommy McCafferty and the ISKA World Heavyweight and Cruiserweight champion, Daniel Quigley.

Toland is himself a former three time "World" kickboxing champion.

Born in Killea, County Donegal, Ireland, Toland regularly trained in Derry. Due to the difficulty of finding sparring partners in Derry and Donegal, he had to travel weekly to Waterford in order to keep in top shape for his upcoming fights.

Today, Toland runs his own gymnasium, PT's Kickboxing Gym in Carrigans, County Donegal. He has helped to develop the current ISKA European ladies Super Flyweight champion, Natalie McCarron, the current ISKA Commonwealth champion Aidan "Lights Out" Lafferty, as well as the two aforementioned World campions.

References

Living people
Year of birth missing (living people)
Place of birth missing (living people)
Irish male kickboxers
Kickboxing trainers
Sportspeople from County Donegal